The 2004 NFL Europe season was the 12th season in 14 years of the American Football league that started out as the World League of American Football. The Cologne Centurions replaced the FC Barcelona Dragons for the 2004 season.

World Bowl XII
Berlin 30–24 Frankfurt
Saturday, June 12, 2004 Arena AufSchalke Gelsenkirchen, Germany

 
2004 in American football
NFL Europe (WLAF) seasons